The 2016 AAA Texas 500 was a NASCAR Sprint Cup Series race held on November 6, 2016, at Texas Motor Speedway in Fort Worth, Texas. Contested over 334 laps on the 1.5 mile (2.4 km) intermediate quad-oval, it was the 34th race of the 2016 NASCAR Sprint Cup Series season, eighth race of the Chase and second race of the Round of 8. This would also turn out to be Carl Edwards 28th and final career victory.

Report

Background

Texas Motor Speedway is a speedway located in the northernmost portion of the U.S. city of Fort Worth, Texas – the portion located in Denton County, Texas. The track measures  around and is banked 24 degrees in the turns, and is of the oval design, where the front straightaway juts outward slightly. The track layout is similar to Atlanta Motor Speedway and Charlotte Motor Speedway (formerly Lowe's Motor Speedway). The track is owned by Speedway Motorsports, Inc., the same company that owns Atlanta and Charlotte Motor Speedways, as well as the short-track Bristol Motor Speedway.

Entry list

First practice
Kyle Busch went to a backup car after hitting the wall exiting turn 4 on his first lap in practice. He said afterwards that he "got into Turn 3 and the car felt good. It loaded really well, but we got back into the throttle and got to the bumps and it bottomed me out a little bit. It got me up the track. From there the whole car just kind of came off the track. I couldn't get it checked up or slowed down in time before it slapped the wall. Speeds are really high here at Texas and when you lose that grip, it happens in a hurry and it got away from me. I wish I would have taken it a little easier but I wasn't even trying that hard to be honest so it was a shock that it happened."

Qualifying

He said afterwards that he couldn't "be happier for RCR and everybody back at the shop. A lot of hard work and effort goes on. We missed the Chase by just two feet. We want to prove that we can win a race by the end of this year. This is big for us. I thought I messed up the lap, truthfully. I got a lot of good speed off of (Turn) 2, but Turn 3 I turned in and missed my corner, but it worked out. Proud of these guys and everybody back home."

Joey Logano, who qualified second, said he "didn’t think it would be anywhere close to the pole" after he "got done with that last run," and that he "didn’t have a very good run in (turn) 2 at all; I missed the bottom. And then realizing how close you were to the pole afterward is the most frustrating part of it, especially after last week.

Kyle Busch's crew chief Adam Stevens, who took the No. 18 car to the garage for a water leak after advancing into the second round, said he thought the leak was "a byproduct of pounding the fence before we even completed a lap in practice. In our hurry to change the motor and all the drivetrain afterwards, apparently we didn't get the lower radiator hose completely clamped on the water neck out of the block and proceeded to dump all the water out of it on pit road after our first run.  We’re going to start 24th and get after them from there.”

After a crash during Saturday's Xfinity Series race, Matt DiBenedetto entered concussion protocol and was not cleared to run the Sprint Cup race. His substitute in the No. 83 was Jeffrey Earnhardt.

Chase Elliott experienced flu-like symptoms during the weekend. Justin Allgaier was named as his standby.

Qualifying results

Practice (post-qualifying)

Second practice

Final practice

Race

First half

The start of the race was delayed for nearly six hours due to rain. The aged surface compounded the drying time. Austin Dillon led the field to the green flag at 7:56 p.m. under yellow flag conditions as the track surface was still not completely dry. The race went green at lap 7. Dillon was no match for Joey Logano who beat him on the restart to take the lead. The second caution of the race flew on lap 29. It was a scheduled competition caution.

The race restarted on lap 34. Green flag stops started on lap 73. Logano pitted from the lead on lap 76 and handed it to Dillon. He pitted the next lap and gave the lead to Denny Hamlin. He pitted the next lap and handed the lead to Kyle Busch who pitted the same lap on the next trip by, and the lead cycled back to Logano.

The third caution flew on lap 109 for Brian Scott spinning out in turn 4.

The race restarted on lap 116. Debris on the backstretch, a piece of hose, brought out the fourth caution on lap 117. The piece of debris punched a hole through the front bumper of Busch's car.

The race restarted on lap 121. The fifth caution flew on lap 143 for Paul Menard spinning in turn 3. Adding to his drama, a tire appeared to "explode" in his stall when it was something related to the inner liner. “When a car spins it generally flat spots the tires, which is exactly what happened here,” said Greg Stucker, Goodyear's director of race tire sales. “It flat spotted both front (tires). The damage that was done to the left front as he drove around the race track looked like it partially unseated the inner liner. So it was actually the inner liner that let go on pit road. It wasn't the tire itself. The tire was already down.”

Second half
The race restarted on lap 149. Green flag stops commenced on lap 188. Logano pitted on lap 189 and the lead cycled to Martin Truex Jr.

He and Edwards were fighting for the lead when both decided to pit on lap 224 and Chase Elliott took over the lead. He pitted the following lap and the lead cycled back to Truex.

The sixth caution flew with 80 laps to go for David Ragan turning Dillon in turn 3. Edwards exited pit road first.

The race restarted with 74 to go. A three-car wreck on the frontstretch involving Dillon, Casey Mears and Scott brought out the seventh caution with 72 to go. Dillon said afterwards that Harvick "sucked down on my door tighter than anybody had all night. He knew how tight he was at my door, that’s why I slid up in front of him. He didn’t check (up). He had the opportunity to. He didn’t like it that the silver spoon kid was outrunning him tonight, so we’ll be alright. We’ve got two weeks left. We just want to come out and win a race.” Harvick said after the race that "there was no intent there. I like racing with Austin. I like everything that they do. There was no reason [to hit him]. I was running seventh [or] sixth. He slid up and got loose and I hit the back of him."

The race restarted with 64 to go. Rain brought out the eighth caution with 45 to go. The race was red-flagged with 41 to go, declared official a few minutes later and Edwards was declared the winner.

Post-race

Driver comments
Edwards said in victory lane that he "actually enjoyed [the race]. Obviously this is what we had to do. The guys got me off pit road first and that's what won it for me. We've got a shot at the championship at Homestead and that's all we wanted."

Logano, who led a race high of 178 laps, said to come "that close to winning and [leading] the most laps, second stings. That's our goal every week, is to win. Anything short of that is a failure. I feel like we were so close to that today. But ultimately, we did gain some points. We're in right now. We were out going into this race. So, you know, we did the best we could as far as leading laps and getting that bonus point, or those two bonus points with the most laps led as well. But we didn't get the win part. That would have been nice."

Race results

Race summary
 Lead changes: 8 among different drivers
 Cautions/Laps: 8 for 37
 Red flags: 1
 Time of race: 3 hours, 16 minutes and 0 seconds
 Average speed:

Media

Television
NBCSN will cover the race on the television side. Rick Allen, two–time Texas winner Jeff Burton and Steve Letarte will have the call in the booth for the race. Dave Burns, Mike Massaro, Marty Snider and Kelli Stavast handle pit road on the television side.

Radio
PRN will have the radio call for the race, which will simulcast on Sirius XM NASCAR Radio.

Standings after the race

Drivers' Championship standings

Manufacturers' Championship standings

Note: Only the first 16 positions are included for the driver standings.

References

2016 in sports in Texas
2016 NASCAR Sprint Cup Series
NASCAR races at Texas Motor Speedway
November 2016 sports events in the United States